HMAS Woomera was an Australian naval vessel operated by the Australian Army and Royal Australian Navy (RAN). She was one of a class of 32 wooden motor vessels built for the Army and entered service in late 1945 as AV 1356 (Ashburton). She was transferred to the RAN on 23 January 1946 and commissioned as Woomera. The ship's main role was carrying stores and dumping obsolete ammunition at sea. In this role she visited many ports in Australia and New Guinea.

On 11 October 1960 an accidental explosion occurred onboard HMAS Woomera while she was dumping ammunition into the sea off Sydney. As a result of the explosion the ship burst into flames and sank, killing two of her crew members. The surviving crew members were rescued by HMAS Quickmatch and HMS Cavendish.

References
 
 

Cargo ships of the Royal Australian Navy
1945 ships
Cargo ships of the Australian Army
Shipwrecks of the Sydney Eastern Suburbs Region
Ships built in Western Australia
Maritime incidents in 1960 
1960 in Australia